The Kyiv State Music Lyceum named for Mykola Vitaliyovych Lysenko is part of the Pyotr Tchaikovsky National Music Academy of Ukraine. 

The boarding school is a specialized secondary music school in Kyiv and one of four schools of its kind in the Ukraine. The main purpose of the school is to train highly professional musicians. 

Its students receive special music education along with their general secondary education.

References 

Educational institutions established in 1934
Music schools
Music schools in Ukraine
Music in Kyiv
Boarding schools in Ukraine